Tifany Roux (born 29 September 1997) is a French World Cup alpine ski racer. She made her World Cup debut on 24 February 2019 in Crans-Montana, Switzerland.

World Cup results

Season standings

World Championship results

References

External links
 
 Tifany Roux Result at the International Ski Federation
 

French female alpine skiers
1997 births
Living people